Noble is a Japanese record label founded in 2001. Specializing in experimental electronic music, especially with influences from glitch and post-rock, artists from its roster have been influential and popular in the Japanese electronic music and post-rock scene.

"Noble Sound"
Noble artists make up the bulk of a wave of Japanese electronic musicians whose work includes synthesized orchestral instruments, glitches in rhythm and samples, and chord progressions and harmonies characteristic of post-rock and shoegaze. Influences from ambient music are also very common, but still with the distinguishing feature of effects-treated samples and glitches. This sound is exemplified by World's End Girlfriend, Kashiwa Daisuke, and Kazumasa Hashimoto.

Artists on roster
 Cinq
 Eisi
 Gutevolk
 Kashiwa Daisuke
 Kazumasa Hashimoto
 Midori Hirano
 Nakaban
 Natsume
 Piana
 Praezisa Rapid 3000
 Serph
 Tenniscoats
 World's End Girlfriend
 Yarn:moor
 Yasushi Yoshida

References

External links
 Official site
 List of artists

Japanese record labels